A crevice is a fracture or fissure in rock.

Crevice may also refer to:

 Crevice corrosion, occurs in spaces to which the access of corrosion-resistant fluid is limited
 Crevice kelpfish (Gibbonsia montereyensis), a species of subtropical clinid
 Crevice Spiny Lizard (Sceloporus poinsettii), a small, typically shy, phrynosomadtid lizard
 Crevice weaver (family Filistatidae), a haplogyne spider that weaves funnel or tube webs

See also
 Crevasse, a deep crack or fissure in an ice sheet or glacier
 Crevis, video game
 Operation Crevice, a 2004 police raid in the United Kingdom